Anders Grahn is a Swedish songwriter, multi-instrumentalist, vocal coach and producer based in Sweden.

Songwriting and producing

The Black Eyed Peas

"BIG LOVE" by the Black Eyed Peas is co-written by Anders Grahn, who also is one of the prominent vocalists in the song's chorus. BIG LOVE was released as the main single for the Grammy-winning group's album Masters of the Sun, release on 12 October 2018. The graphic video, a 9-minute double video for the same song with two different stories, addresses both school shootings in the United States, as well as children being taken from their parents by the border to the US, and is a collaboration with two organizations, March For Our Lives and Families Belong Together.

Anastacia 

Grahn is one of the writers ("Why" and "Higher Living") and additional producers ("Before" and "Reckless") as well as guitarist, background singer, percussionist and bass player on Anastacia's album Evolution. Released 15 September 2017. During 2017 and 2018 Grahn has been touring as guitarist with Anastacia on her Ultimate Collection Tour and Evolution Tour in a total of 110 shows in 25 countries.

Andrew McMahon 
"Cecilia and the Satellite" features in the CBS superhero action drama, Supergirl, as well as in the TV spot for the Warner Bros. Pictures film Pan and the Fox Network series Red Band Society. In 2018, it was featured in the trailer for the motion picture Welcome to Marwen. The single went gold (500,000 units sold) in the U.S. on 28 June 2016.

Haley Reinhart 

	
2016Grahn has co-written 5 of the 11 tracks on Haley Reinhart's full-length album Better. The title track was released as the lead single, "Listen," co-written with Reinhart and Maria Marcus, was featured in the trailer of the showtime Network series Years of Living Dangerously, executive produced by James Cameron. The album debuted at no. 22 on the Billboard Independent Albums Chart in May 2016.

2017On 15 September 2017, the single & video for "Let's Start" was released. Co-written with Reinhart and Rob Kleiner, the song is one out of just three original songs on the album What's That Sound? (Concord Records). The same trio also wrote "Somewhere In Between."
 			
2018In June 2018, Reinhart did a flash release of the 2.5-minute long bossa-nova, "Last Kiss Goodbye," written by Reinhart and Grahn. The writing duo also produced the song together. "Don't Know How To Love You" is written by Grahn, Reinhart and Rob Kleiner. The song became the fastest-growing original song for Reinhart since 2011. The American rapper Russel Vitale, aka RUSS, released the mini EP "Just In Case" on 23 December 2018.

2022
A.G produced the EP ”Off The Ground” in Malmö, Sweden together with close friend, and acclaimed producer, artist and musician, Tingsek,  during 2020-2021. 
Anders is also the co-writer on five out of the seven tracks on this EP/Album.

”Lovergirl” and ”21st Century” were both written in London, UK and date all the way back to 2015. 
Anders & Haley wrote ”Lovergirl” together, and the latter title was penned together with H.R and 
Bhavik Pattani (a.k.a. BHAV).
”Change” was written in L.A together with H.R and musical mastermind 
Rob Kleiner in 2019, and the last two titles, ”Looking At You” (feat. Tingsek) and ”Roll The Dice” were created during the process of recording this EP in 2021, both co-written with Tingsek, and Haley of course - over zoom from L.A.

TVXQ 

The single "Android" with the Korean band TVXQ went gold in just one day, and it was the best-selling album in the world during its week of release in the spring of 2013. It went platinum in Japan a few weeks after coming out on the market and together with two other tracks for the same band, "Disvelocity" and "Tree of Life," approximately 1,500,000 units were sold. The two other songs written by Anders have both sold gold and platinum in Japan as well.

In October 2017, TVXQ released its greatest hits album Fine collection - Begin again featuring both "Android" and "Tree of life." After two days it became the best selling album of the week in Japan.

Hayley Kiyoko 

Grahn, James Flannigan and the singer/songwriter/actress Hayley Kiyoko cowrote "Rich Youth" featured on Hayley's EP A Belle to Remember, released in 2013 and "Given it All," featured on the EP This Side of Paradise, released in 2015.

Discography

References

Swedish guitarists
Male guitarists
Swedish songwriters
Swedish record producers
Musicians from London
Musicians from Malmö
1979 births
Living people
21st-century guitarists
Swedish male musicians